The C R Wilson Body Company with its plant located at Milwaukee Junction, Detroit, Michigan was incorporated in 1897. Early customers included Cadillac, Ford, Oldsmobile, and many other now forgotten brands.

Foundation
It grew from Wilson brothers' blacksmith and wagon repair shop which soon began to manufacture wagons then carriages. The brothers split the business by products and Charles R Wilson formed the C R Wilson Carriage Company followed by a new incorporation, C R Wilson Body Company.

Cadillac
Wilson built Cadillac's first closed production body.

Ford
Wilson provided the first bodies for Ford's Model T.

Alumni
Former employees included the Fisher brothers who founded Fisher Body Company. Henry Ford appears in a photograph of Wilson staff dated around 1900.

Murray Body Corporation
On the sudden death of Charles R Wilson in 1924 a merger was negotiated with the owners of J W Murray Manufacturing Company, Towson Body Company and J C Widman Body Company under the name Murray Body Corporation.

References

Coachbuilders of the United States
Manufacturing companies based in Michigan
Companies based in Michigan
Vehicle manufacturing companies established in 1897
1897 establishments in Michigan
Economy of Detroit